Sare N'Dyaye (ruled c.1370–c.1390) was the second ruler, or Burba, of the Jolof Empire.

References

14th-century monarchs in Africa
Year of birth missing
1390 deaths